42 athletes (32 men and 10 women) from Hungary competed at the 1996 Summer Paralympics in Atlanta, United States.

Medallists

See also
Hungary at the Paralympics
Hungary at the 1996 Summer Olympics

References 

Nations at the 1996 Summer Paralympics
1996
Summer Paralympics